Leeds Pride is an annual LGBT Pride celebration held in the city of Leeds, West Yorkshire, England.

History
Leeds Pride first took place in August 2006 (then called Leeds Gay Pride) - there had been previous Pride events in Leeds such as Hyde Out in 2000 and in the few years before the first Leeds Pride, an informal picnic on Woodhouse Moor. Leeds Pride was supported by the city council and local business with 6,500 attending. In 2009 the numbers attending the event had almost doubled, to 12000, with over 1,000 participating in the parade. In its tenth year (2016) the name had changed to Leeds Pride and it had over 40,000 people in attendance, with the figure expected to grow in year on year.

The 2018 Leeds Pride took place on Sunday 5 August with over 100 floats.

Parade
The parade starts at Millennium Square at around 2.00 pm finishing on Lower Briggate by The Calls with a huge party. The economic impact to the city centre of Leeds is approximately £3.8 million.

Buildings on the parade route often have temporary decorations in the colours of the Rainbow flag.  In 2017, the railway viaduct over Lower Briggate was painted in these colours and named 'Freedom Bridge" by Leeds City Council and Network Rail.  Steps going up to the station are also painted in the same colours as is a telephone box (an aql wi-fi hub, close to their headquarters) on Bridge End.

Rainbow plaques
In association with the 2018 event, Leeds Civic Trust announced that it would be expanding its blue plaque scheme to create a trail of Rainbow Plaques to commemorate those who have contributed to the LGBT+ story of Leeds.  A map has been published showing the location of 15 plaques.

See also

 LGBT culture in Leeds
 List of Leeds Civic Trust plaques

References

External links

 

2005 establishments in England
Annual events in England
Festivals in Leeds
Leeds City Region
LGBT culture in Leeds
Pride parades in England
Festivals established in 2005